The 2011 South Korean football betting scandal involved South Korea's top professional football leagues, K-League. In mid-2011, South Korean association football, especially K-League, was overshadowed by the discovery of match fixing scandal among the players, brokers such as gangsters and coaches in K-League.

Background
After an arrest warrant was issued for two football players on 25 May 2011 by the Supreme Prosecutors' Office, the K-League's match-fixing case began to surface. The prosecutors arrested two brokers and are investigating 10 players, including Sangju Sangmu Phoenix's striker and former national team member Kim Dong-hyun. The inception of this scandal was the alleged suicide of one footballer named Yoon Ki-Won of Incheon United. His suicide was amplified with the match-fixing allegations through media and football fans. But K-League trying to purified itself and other persons who were involved in match-fixing didn't appear, match-fixing scandal was an open secret in K-League through the illegal betting sites.

Affected football matches
On 7 July 2011, Changwon division of Supreme Prosecutors' Office revealed fifteen match-fixing matches.

Bold team is leading the match-fixing 

On 4 August 2011, Changwon division of Supreme Prosecutors' Office revealed additional four match-fixing matches.

Also, 2011 season's two matches were related match-fixing.

First investigation
The reports of the arrests of two footballers by the South Korean media had led to the exposure of the initial match-fixing scandals in the K-League. Especially, former national football team member Kim Dong-hyun, who was believed to have deep connections to accomplices. The arrested footballers were Park Sang-Wook of Daejeon Citizen and Sung Kyung-Mo of Gwangju FC.

On 27 May 2011, four players of Daejeon Citizen were also arrested and more extensive investigations were held into match-fixing. On 30 May 2011, former footballer Jung Jong-Kwan, who played for Jeonbuk Hyundai Motors was found dead in an apparent suicide.  In his suicide note, he said "I’m ashamed of myself as a person involved in the match fixing scandal. Those under investigation are all my friends and they haven’t blown my name because of friendship. All is my fault and I got them involved."

Penalties
On 17 June 2011, the Changwon division of Supreme Prosecutors' Office announced an investigation result of match-fixing. Ten football players were banned from playing in the South Korean football permanently. Kim Jung-Kyum of Pohang Steelers was banned for five years in South Korean football, because he made unfair profits from the knowledge of match-fixing. Daejeon Citizen's dividend of Sports Toto was reduced 30% for the 2011 season, and Gwangju FC and Sangju Sangmu Phoenix was reduced by 10% each.

 Expelled permanently (10 players): Kim Dong-hyun, (Sangju Sangmu Phoenix); Sung Kyung-Mo, (Gwangju FC); Park Sang-Wook, Kim Ba-Woo, Sin Jun-Bae, Yang Jung-Min, Kwak Chang-Hee, Kang Gu-Nam, Lee Jung-Won and Lee Myeong-Cheol, (all Daejeon Citizen)
 Expelled for five years (1 player): Kim Jung-Kyum, (Pohang Steelers)
 Reduce the profit (3 clubs): Daejeon Citizen (-30% of sportstoto dividend), Sangju Sangmu Phoenix and Gwangju FC (-10%)
 Players involved lost all opportunities to make the All Asia Space Team

Second investigation
After first investigation ended, Changwon division of Supreme Prosecutors' Office and the military prosecution broadened the scope of the investigation. The first investigation was focused on related to Daejeon Citizen's players, second investigation was focused on related to Chunnam Dragons' players.

On 7 July 2011, Changwon division of Supreme Prosecutors' Office announced investigation result of match-fixing. Ten retired and active football players were arrested on related match-fixing. And 29 retired and active football players were under indictment and three players were summarily indicted.

 footballers were arrested :
 Kim Seung-Hyun (Honam University coach, formerly Chunnam Dragons)
 Kim Hyung-Ho (Chunnam Dragons)
 Park Ji-Yong (Gangwon FC, formerly Chunnam Dragons)
 Song Jung-Hyun (Chunnam Dragons)
 Yeom Dong-Gyun (Jeonbuk Hyundai Motors, formerly Chunnam Dragons)
 Jung Yoon-Sung (Chunnam Dragons)
 Lee Sang-Hong (Busan I'Park, formerly Chunnam Dragons)
 Park Sang-Cheol (Sangju Sangmu Phoenix, formerly Chunnam Dragons)
 Kim Jee-Hyuk (Sangju Sangmu Phoenix, formerly Gwangju Sangmu FC)
 Ju Kwang-Youn (Sangju Sangmu Phoenix, formerly Gwangju Sangmu FC)
Kim Dong-hyun (Sangju Sangmu Phoenix), Park Sang-Wook, Sin Jun-Bae, Yang Jung-Min (all Daejeon Citizen) were arrested in 1st investigation, but weren't arrested in 2nd investigation.

 football players were under indictment :
 11 players from Gwangju Sangmu FC formerly (Choi Sung-Kuk, Chun Je-Hun, Jang Hyun-Kyu, Lim In-Sung, Park Byung-Gyu, Seo Min-Gook, Seong Kyung-Il, Yoon Yeo-San, ?, ?, ?)
 5 players from Daejeon Citizen formerly (Hwang Ji-Yoon, Kwon Jip, Lee Kyung-Hwan, Ou Kyoung-Jun, Park Jung-Hye)
 5 players from Incheon United formerly (Ahn Hyun-Sik, Do Hwa-Sung, Lee Jun-Young, Park Chang-Heon, ?)
 4 players from Daegu FC formerly (An Sung-Min, Jang Nam-Seok, Lee Sang-Duk, Oh Joo-Hyun or On Byung-Hoon)
 3 players from Busan I'Park formerly (Hong Seong-Yo, Kim Eung-Jin, Lee Jung-Ho)
 1 players from Chunnam Dragons formerly (Baek Seung-Min)
 football players were summarily indicted :
 3 players from Daegu FC formerly (Cho Hyung-Ik, Oh Joo-Hyun or On Byung-Hoon, Yang Seung-Won)

On 12 July 2011, Sangju Sangmu Phoenix's manager Lee Soo-Chul was arrested for accepting bribes and intimidation charges in 2010 season.

Imprisonment
On 29 August 2011, the Changwon division of Supreme Prosecutors' Office had sentenced thirty-nine retired & current footballers to imprisonment, and fines of 5 million won and as many as seven-years jail sentence.

Imprisonment
 Kim Kyung-Rok (broker) : 7 years of prison labor
 A man surnamed Kim (broker) : 2 years of prison labor
 Two financier : 2 years of prison labor each
 Kim Myung-Hwan : 3 years and a half of prison labor and charged in addition fee (35 million won)
 Lee Sang-Hong : 3 years of prison labor and charged in addition fee (55 million won)
 Choi Sung-Hyun (broker) : 3 years of prison labor
 Kwon Jip : 3 years of prison labor
 Park Sang-Wook : 2 years and a half of prison labor and charged in addition fee (36 million won)
 Kim Ba-Woo : 2 years and a half of prison labor and charged in addition fee (40 million won)
 Yang Jung-Min : 2 years and a half of prison labor and charged in addition fee (22 million won)
 Kim Deok-Joong (broker) : 2 years and a half of prison labor
 Kim Jung-Kyum : 2 years of prison labor and given 2 years probation
 Jung Yoon-Sung : 2 years of prison labor and charged in addition fee (29 million won)
 Yeom Dong-Gyun : 2 years of prison labor and charged in addition fee (24 million won)
 Sin Jun-Bae : 2 years of prison labor and charged in addition fee (18 million won)
 Kwon Sang-Tae (broker) : 1 years and a half of prison labor, given 2 years probation and sentenced to 120 hours of community service
 Kim Hyung-Ho : 1 years and a half of prison labor and charged in addition fee (23 million won)
 Sung Kyung-Mo : 1 years and a half of prison labor and charged in addition fee (20 million won)
 Park Ji-Yong : 1 years and a half of prison labor and charged in addition fee (14 million won)
 Kang Gu-Nam : 1 years of prison labor and charged in addition fee (8 million won)
 Do Hwa-Sung : 1 years of prison labor and charged in addition fee (5 million won)
 Jeon Kwang-Jin (broker) : 1 years of prison labor
 Kwak Chang-Hee : 10 months of prison labor, given 2 years probation, charged in addition fee (6.2 million won) and sentenced to 100 hours of community service

be fined
 Park Jung-Hye : imposed fine (7 million won) and charged in addition fee (7 million won)
 Ou Kyoung-Jun : imposed fine (7 million won) and charged in addition fee (7 million won)
 Lee Kyung-Hwan : imposed fine (7 million won) and charged in addition fee (7 million won)
 Sung Kyung-Il : imposed fine (5 million won) and charged in addition fee (3 million won)
 Park Chang-Heon : imposed fine (5 million won) and charged in addition fee (3 million won)
 Park Byung-Gyu : imposed fine (5 million won) and charged in addition fee (3 million won)
 Lee Jung-Won : imposed fine (5 million won) and charged in addition fee (2 million won)
 Lee Myeong-Cheol : imposed fine (5 million won) and charged in addition fee (1.5 million won)

See also 

 Calciopoli
 Brazilian football match-fixing scandal
 2005 Bundesliga scandal
 2011 Turkish sports corruption scandal

References

Sports betting scandals
2011 in South Korean football
Football in South Korea
Scandals in South Korea
2011 scandals